Cintra is a historic home located at New Hope, Bucks County, Pennsylvania. The house was built in 1824, and is a -story, "L"-shaped, stuccoed stone dwelling with a hipped roof.  It has a central hub flanked by two identical wings, and is said to have been designed after a Portuguese palace.

It was added to the National Register of Historic Places in 1985.

References

Houses on the National Register of Historic Places in Pennsylvania
Houses completed in 1824
Houses in Bucks County, Pennsylvania
National Register of Historic Places in Bucks County, Pennsylvania
1824 establishments in Pennsylvania